Lola Montez (Marie Dolores Eliza Rosanna Gilbert, Countess of Landsfeld, 1821–1861), was an Irish dancer and actress.

Lola Montez or Lola Montes may also refer to:

 Lola Montez (musical), a 1958 Australian musical 
 "Lola Montez" (song), by Volbeat, 2013
 Lola Montez (1918 film), a German silent film 
 Lola Montez (1919 film), a loose sequel
 Lola Montes (1944 film), a Spanish historical drama film 
 Lola Montez (1962 film), an Australian musical film
 Lola Montez, the King's Dancer, a 1922 German silent historical drama film
 Lola Montez (One Life to Live), a fictional character in the soap opera
 Lola Montès, a 1955 historical romance film based on the life of Lola Montez
 Lola Montes (dancer) (1918–2008), stage name of Chita Equizabal, American-born Spanish dancer

See also
Montez, a surname